Anne-Marie Boutet de Monvel (née Berthier, born 1948, also published as Anne-Marie Berthier and Anne-Marie Boutet de Monvel-Berthier) is a French applied mathematician and mathematical physicist, and a professor emerita in the University of Paris, affiliated with the Institut de mathématiques de Jussieu – Paris Rive Gauche.

Books
Boutet de Monvel is the author of Spectral theory and wave operators for the Schrödinger equation (Pitman, 1982). With Werner Amrein and Vladimir Georgescu she is the co-author of Hardy type inequalities for abstract differential operators (American Mathematical Society, 1987) and  -groups, commutator methods and spectral theory of -body Hamiltonians (Birkhäuser, 1996).

For many years she was co-editor-in-chief of the book series Progress in Mathematical Physics, following its relaunch by Birkhäuser in 1999.

Recognition
She was named a Fellow of the American Mathematical Society, in the 2022 class of fellows, "for contributions to mathematical physics, particularly Schroedinger operator theory, and to the theory of integrable systems".

Personal life
Boutet de Monvel was married to Louis Boutet de Monvel (1941–2014), also a mathematician.

References

External links
Home page

1948 births
Living people
21st-century French mathematicians
French women mathematicians
French physicists
French women physicists
Fellows of the American Mathematical Society
Applied mathematicians
Mathematical physicists
20th-century French mathematicians